Diana Penty (born 2 November 1985) is an Indian actress who works predominantly in Hindi films. She began her modelling career in 2005 when she was signed up by Elite Models India. Penty then made her acting debut with the romantic comedy film Cocktail (2012), a box office success, for which she received Filmfare Award for Best Female Debut nomination.

Post a four-year hiatus, Penty starred in the titular role of Happy in Happy Bhag Jayegi (2016), a sleeper hit receiving BIG Star Most Entertaining Actress in a Comedy Film nomination. She went on to portray a NGO worker in Lucknow Central (2017), an army officer in Parmanu: The Story of Pokhran (2018), a public service volunteer in Shiddat (2021) and the leading lady in the Malayalam film Salute (2022).

In addition to her acting career, Penty is a prominent celebrity endorser for brands and products.

Early life and education
Penty was born on 2 November 1985 in Mumbai, Maharashtra to a Parsi father and a Konkani Christian mother. She attended St. Agnes High School in Mumbai, and graduated with a bachelor's degree in Mass Media from St. Xavier's College.

Career

Modelling career (2005–2011)

Penty began her modeling when she sent her photographs to Elite Models India, who liked her work and suggested she take up modelling assignments. At this stage, she was in college and was reluctant to choose a career in modeling, so Penty decided to work part-time as a fashion model. 
In 2005, Penty officially started working for Elite Models India, and made her runway debut at the Indo-Italian Festival for Italian designers Nicola Trussardi and Gianfranco Ferré. Thereafter, Penty modelled for several other Indian designers, including Wendell Rodricks, Rohit Bal and Rina Dhaka. By 2007, she had established a successful modelling career after appearing in print campaigns for some of India's most prominent brands, including Tribhovandas Bhimji Zaveri, Parachute and Westside; as well as featuring on the covers of a few Indian fashion magazines.

The following year, Penty went on to model at an international circuit when she started to endorse global brands excluding Maybelline, Garnier and Forever 21. On Penty's international appeal, the CEO of Elite Models India Sushma Puri commented, "Diana has a face that is very versatile and appeals to both Indian and international markets and she is also young, beautiful and confident. This makes her the ideal choice for any international brand." Later in her modelling career Penty started to receive film offers, though she believed herself to be too inexperienced, and rejected them to focus on modelling. From 2008 to 2010, Penty established herself internationally after modelling for fashion weeks in Paris and New York.

Film debut and breakthrough (2012–2018)
Penty was originally slated to make her Bollywood debut in 2011 with Imtiaz Ali's Rockstar opposite Ranbir Kapoor, although she rejected the film due to her modelling commitments at the time and was subsequently replaced by Nargis Fakhri. She later signed up for Homi Adajania's Cocktail instead; at Ali's suggestion. Cast alongside Saif Ali Khan and Deepika Padukone, the film received mixed to positive reviews. Penty's portrayal of Meera, a simple Indian girl with traditional values was well received by critics. Taran Adarsh of Bollywood Hungama commented that "Diana, who makes her acting debut, gets to portray a rather difficult character for her debut film. There's a very disarming kind of innocence that she brings to the role and she impresses a great deal." Raja Sen agreed, mentioning that she is "refreshingly natural". Anupama Chopra added that "Diana is saddled with the most colourless character but [...] infuses her role with a quiet poise and holds her own." Her performance earned her nominations for best debut and best supporting actress at numerous Indian award ceremonies, including International Indian Film Academy Award for Best Supporting Actress. Cocktail emerged as a box office hit.

After a four-year absence from the screen, Penty played the titular runaway bride in Aanand L. Rai's production Happy Bhag Jayegi (2016), written and directed by Mudassar Aziz, which tells the story of her character's ensuing adventures when, in an attempt to elope with her lover, she instead ends up on the other side of the border, much to the chagrin of a young politician whose house she ends up in. About the break from acting, Penty said: "It wasn't a conscious break. I was taking my time looking to be a part of an interesting story. I didn't want to do anything that came my way." The film earned mixed reviews from critics but was a sleeper hit. Rohit Bhatnagar wrote that Penty "steals the spotlight in every frame", while Anna M. M. Vetticad of Firstpost said: "Penty is brimming with potential [...] but her Happy, despite being the titular protagonist, is the most under-written character."

Her sole role in 2017 was that of Gayatri Kashyap, a diligent NGO worker who champions the cause of a band formed by a group of prison inmates, in debutante Ranjit Tiwari's prison film Lucknow Central, which starred her alongside Farhan Akhtar. Times of India noted that she plays her part well.

Penty had two releases in 2018. Her first appearance was as Captain Ambalika Bandyopadhyay, in Abhishek Sharma's period drama Parmanu: The Story of Pokhran opposite John Abraham, which was a commercial success. Bollywood Hungama mentioned, "Diana Penty has a crucial part and essays the no nonsense character very well." In her second appearance of the year, she reprised her titular role in Happy Phirr Bhag Jayegi, a sequel to Happy Bhag Jayegi, alongside Sonakshi Sinha, who played an eponymous namesake; the film underperformed compared to the prequel.

Career progression (2019-present)
In 2019, she had special song appearance alongside singer Badshah and actors Suniel Shetty and Raveena Tandon as the proverbial "Shehar Ki Ladki" in a promotional music video of the song, a remake of an eponymous hit, for Khandaani Shafakhana (2019).

Penty portrayed Ira Sharma Sehgal, a public service volunteer who has a friction of ideology with her husband, in director Kunal Deshmukh's 2021 romantic drama Shiddat. India Today noted, "Though Diana Penty gets extremely limited screen time in comparison to her male counterparts, she leave a mark as free-spirited, practical and open-minded women." Penty marked her Malayalam film debut with the 2022 film Salute alongside Dulquer Salmaan portraying Dia, Salmaan's love interest. Hindustan Times mentioned, "The women have very less to contribute to the film and Diana Penty gets wasted in a role that has no impact."

Penty portrayed Naina, opposite Akshay Kumar in Raj Mehta's Selfiee. Bollywood Hungama stated, "Though Diana Penty doesn’t have much to do but she underplays her part well." Penty will next appear in Shabbir Khan's Adbhut alongside Nawazuddin Siddiqui.

Off-screen work

Inspired by her character in Lucknow Central, Penty volunteered for an NGO in 2017. She also supports a number of causes.  In 2020, she provides safety gear to Mumbai police amid the COVID-19 pandemic and additionally collaborated with Ketto India for the initiative #EveryLifeMatters, to help provide relief and financial support during the crisis.

Penty made her Cannes Film Festival debut in 2019 and has subsequently appeared on the red carpet the following years. She has ramp walked at the Lakme Fashion Week. She has been cover model for several magazines including Vogue, Elle, Verve, Women's Health India, Grazia India and Femina among others.

Penty has been very vocal on various issues. Praising the #MeToo movement, she said, "I am proud that the #MeToo movement has kick-started. It is commendable that women are coming out and bringing light to the issues which they went through in the past. It takes a lot of courage."

Controversy
During Happy Bhag Jayegi musical event in 2016, Mika Singh cracked a joke on Penty's surname, that did not go well with her. After much prodding, the actress opened up on the matter and said, "I don’t find these jokes funny. I don’t even understand how people laugh at such comments."

Artistry and public image
Post her debut, Penty was termed as the "next big thing" in Hindi cinema. Aishwarya Acharya of Femina finds her to be "sensitive, astute, calm, passionate and hopeful". Rajeev Masand termed her "refreshingly natural". Grazia's Tanya Mehta says Penty has a "compelling onscreen presence" and added that she is here to stay. 

Penty was placed 10th in Times of India's 10 Most Promising Female Newcomers of 2012 list. She won Grazia Face of the Year in 2013. She was placed 15th in Eastern Eyes 50 Sexiest Asian Women List. She ranked 25th in 2013 and 23rd in 2019 in Times' 50 Most Desirable Woman List.

Penty took a hiatus of 4 years just after her debut film. On her approach of choosing films, she said,

Apart from acting and modelling, Penty is an endorser for several brands and products including TRESemmé and Nokia, in particular the Lumia 510. She became the first Indian star to endorse Estée Lauder India. She is also the current brand ambassador of Garnier.

Filmography

Films

All films are in Hindi unless otherwise noted.

Music video

Accolades

References

External links
 
 

 

1985 births
21st-century Indian actresses
Actresses from Mumbai
Actresses in Hindi cinema
Female models from Mumbai
Indian film actresses
Living people
St. Xavier's College, Mumbai alumni
Parsi people from Mumbai
Indian Christians
Actresses in Malayalam cinema